Season of the Tiger is a six-part docudrama that follows members of the Grambling State University (LA) marching band and football team during the 2005-2006 football season.

Produced by Daftfilms and Black Entertainment Television (BET), Season of the Tiger premiered on April 27, 2006 at 9:30 p.m.  The subsequent episodes were shown at the same Thursday time slot for the following five weeks.

In documentary style, the show focuses on the lives of three band members and two football players as they try to fulfill their potential, despite the setbacks they encounter along the way.  Season of the Tiger is the second BET reality show to focus on life at a historically black institution (HBCU) (see College Hill), and the first to highlight the competitive environment of marching bands at some HBCUs.

Grambling State standout starting quarterback and NFL prospect Bruce Eugene is among the many featured in the docudrama.

References 

BET original programming
Grambling State Tigers football
2000s American reality television series
2006 American television series debuts
2006 American television series endings